Otis Garrett (1905–1941) was an American film editor, screenwriter and film director.

Filmography

Director
 The Last Express (1938)
 Danger on the Air (1938)
 The Black Doll (1938)
 Personal Secretary (1938)
 The Lady in the Morgue (1938)
 Exile Express (1939)
 Mystery of the White Room (1939)
 The Witness Vanishes (1939)
 Sandy Gets Her Man (1940)
 Margie (1940)
 World Premiere (1941)

Editor
 The Guilty Generation (1931)
 Behind the Mask (1932)
 The Crusader (1932)
 The Unwritten Law (1932)
 The Mystic Hour (1933)
 The Vampire Bat (1933)
 Gigolettes of Paris (1933)
 The World Gone Mad (1933)
 Curtain at Eight (1933)
 The Sin of Nora Moran (1933)
 What Price Decency (1933)
 Sing Sinner Sing (1933)
 Unknown Blonde (1934)
 Breezing Home (1937)
 Night Key (1937)
 The Westland Case (1937)

Screenwriter
 Age of Indiscretion (1935)
 O'Shaughnessy's Boy (1935)
 Woman Wanted (1935)
 Meet the Chump (1941)

References

Bibliography
 Shelley, Peter. Frances Farmer: The Life and Films of a Troubled Star. McFarland, 2014.

External links

1905 births
1941 deaths
American screenwriters
American film editors
American film directors